The extrasolar planet, designated as HD 4208 b, was discovered by the California and Carnegie Planet Search team using the Keck telescope. The planet is probably somewhat less massive than Jupiter, although only its minimum mass is known. Its orbital distance is 1.67 AU, slightly further than Mars and its eccentricity is low.

The planet HD 4208 b is named Xolotlan. The name was selected in the NameExoWorlds campaign by Nicaragua, during the 100th anniversary of the IAU. Xolotlan is the name of Lake Managua in Nahualt language.

References

External links
 

Exoplanets discovered in 2001
Giant planets
Sculptor (constellation)
Exoplanets detected by radial velocity
Exoplanets with proper names